A Chronicle of Tahrir square is a 2014 American-Egyptian independent historic short film written and directed by Nour Zaki. 
The film won at the 2014 Women’s voices now film festival and was screened at the Chinese theater in Hollywood as a part of the Holly-shorts film festival. The movie sheds the light on the events that occurred in Tahrir Square on 2 February 2011 and the clashes between the anti and pro Mubarak crowd.

Plot
During the climax of the 2011 Egyptian revolution, a young Egyptian girl must go through the violent square to save her father.

Awards

 Women’s voices now film festival 2014 - Winner

References

 https://web.archive.org/web/20160629135757/http://www.womensvoicesnow.org/a-chronicle-of-tahrir-square
 http://o.canada.com/entertainment/movies/egypts-first-oscar-nominated-film-a-chronicle-of-tahrir-square-faces-challenges-back-home

External links
 
 https://vimeo.com/89991396
 https://www.youtube.com/watch?v=FViprOXKiyI
 https://www.elcinema.com/en/work/2035840/

Films about the Arab Spring
2014 films
2010s English-language films